Rachel Scott, born Rachel Cook (8 March 1848 – 27 November 1905), was a British women's education reformer, based in Manchester, who organised and promoted equality for women.

Early life and personal education 
Rachel Susan Cook came from an academic family in St Andrews, one of five sisters. Her paternal line included three generations of divinity professors, including a Moderator of the Church of Scotland. Her education was at St Andrew's senior school, Madras College; by a private tutor; and then as one of the first 6 female students enrolled at the College for Women at Benslow House in Hitchin, which later became the University of Cambridge's Girton College, with another Scottish woman, Louisa Innes Lumsden. At this time, such women graduates were "rather special people ... exceptionally able, determined, ambitious". In 1873, Cook "graduated" as one of the first women at the University of Cambridge with honours in the classic Tripos, at second class.

This achievement was significant given the challenges women faced in higher education. Sarah Woodhead, Cook and Lumsden were considered "the Girton pioneers", with Cook also described as "a tall, dark, willowy beauty with the melancholy air of one of Rossetti's nymphs, classical features and graceful movements. George Eliot described her as "sylphlike", and the most beautiful woman she had ever seen; and there still remains in the minds of those who knew her then a memorable picture of her uncommonness, her dramatic instinct and critical quickness, and her eagerness and radiance of mind.

Campaign for women's education 
In 1874 she married Charles Scott, known as C. P. Scott, editor of the Manchester Guardian, and moved to Manchester, where she soon joined the governing body of the city's Girls' High School. She continued to champion women's higher education by creating a home-based university level teaching facility, supported by sympathetic professors from Owens College. Through her unstinting efforts this became incorporated into Owens College in 1883.

Scott also served on the Withington Girls School governing body and was interested in the co-educational school Lady Barn House School and took a lead role in education in the City; her eloquent elocution at public events to raise support for education for women and girls, was remarked upon on in her obituary.

Her final speech in 1900 was in the Free Trade Hall to the assembled Manchester High School for Girls community.

Publishing anonymously, Scott translated classical Latin and French texts, including Balzac’s Human Comedy with Clara Bell and others, as well as a guide to pictures in the Manchester Jubilee Exhibition of 1887. With her husband who was the editor, she contributed critical items to the Manchester Guardian supporting women's right to vote as a suffragist.

Scott's influence and contribution to the city of Manchester was recognised in her husband's obituary.

References

External links 

 https://www.timeshighereducation.com/features/should-we-be-worried-women-outnumber-men-campus
 https://www.theguardian.com/education/2017/aug/28/university-gender-gap-at-record-high-as-30000-more-women-accepted

1848 births
1905 deaths
British women's rights activists
Education reform
Alumni of Girton College, Cambridge
People from St Andrews
Scottish activists
Scottish suffragists